Bloc of Communists and Non-Partisans was a political alliance in the Soviet Union of the Communist Party with non-partisans, which nominated its candidates on a non-alternative basis in all elections to the Soviets from 1937 to 1985.

References

Political parties established in 1936
Political parties disestablished in 1990
1936 establishments in the Soviet Union
1990 disestablishments in the Soviet Union